Geoff Berman is an American political operative. In November 2017, he became the Executive Director of the New York State Democratic Committee, coordinating the party's electoral efforts in a year that saw Democrats flip three U.S. congressional seats and gain control of the state senate in New York.
He is a veteran of both the 2008 and 2012 Barack Obama presidential campaigns. He served in a variety of roles for President Obama’s political organization over the course of seven years, including as the New York State Director of Organizing for America and as Deputy National Training Director and GOTV Director for the 2012 re-election campaign.

He also runs a consulting practice and is an adjunct professor at NYU’s Wagner School. His previous roles include Vice President of Programs at Educators for Excellence, and Senior Advisor to Everytown for Gun Safety, attorney at Weil Gotshal & Manges LLP, and Artistic Director for the Atlantic Theater Company Acting School.

He is a graduate of UCLA and University of Virginia Law School. He was born in St. Louis, Missouri and lives with his wife Alexandra in Brooklyn, New York, where he has lived for over 20 years.

References

Year of birth missing (living people)
Living people
New York (state) Democrats
Lawyers from New York City
University of California, Los Angeles alumni
University of Virginia School of Law alumni
People from Brooklyn
Lawyers from St. Louis
Barack Obama 2012 presidential campaign
New York University faculty
Barack Obama 2008 presidential campaign